

"Wagon Wheels" is a Western song written by Billy Hill and Peter DeRose in the early 1930s. Members of the Western Writers of America chose it as one of the Top 100 Western songs of all time.

Background
The song was used as the title song in the 1934 western movie Wagon Wheels, starring Randolph Scott and Gail Patrick. It was sung by Everett Marshall in the Ziegfeld Follies of 1934.

"Wagon Wheels" has been recorded dozens of times over the years, by artists including Paul Whiteman and His Orchestra and Paul Robeson in 1934, and Sammy Davis, Jr., The Platters, and Johnnie Ray later on.

References 

1934 songs
Songs with music by Peter DeRose
Songs from musicals
Songs written by Billy Hill (songwriter)